Bombus mixtus is a species of bumblebee. It is native to western North America, where it occurs in western Canada and the United States. It is also disjunct in the Great Lakes region. It is known commonly as the fuzzy-horned bumblebee, tricoloured bumblebee, orange-belted bumblebee, and mixed bumblebee.

This bee lives in mountain habitat, and taiga and tundra habitat in northern areas. It lives in open, grassy habitat, chaparral, shrublands, and meadows. It feeds at the flowers of ceanothus, fireweed, coyote mints, penstemons, phacelias, rhododendrons, and groundsels. It nests underground or on the surface.

References

External links
NatureServe. 2015. Bombus mixtus. NatureServe Explorer Version 7.1. Accessed 8 March 2016.

NatureServe secure species
Bumblebees
Hymenoptera of North America
Insects described in 1878
Taxa named by Ezra Townsend Cresson